Harry Rubenstein (January 27, 1895 – February 23, 1974), known professionally as Harry Ruby, was an American actor, pianist, composer, songwriter and screenwriter, who was inducted into the Songwriters Hall of Fame in 1970. He was married to silent film actress Eileen Percy.

Biography

Ruby was born in New York City in 1895. After failing at his early ambition to become a professional baseball player, he toured the vaudeville circuit as a pianist with the Bootblack Trio and the Messenger Boys Trio.

In his early career worked as a pianist and song plugger for the Gus Edwards and Harry Von Tilzer publishing firms (one of his co-workers at Edwards' place was the young Walter Winchell, who was also a song plugger). Ruby also played in vaudeville acts, nickelodeons and cafes throughout New York.

From 1917-1920, Ruby collaborated with songwriters Edgar Leslie, Sam Lewis, Joe Young and George Jessel on the hit songs “What’ll We Do Saturday Night When the Town Goes Dry”, “When Those Sweet Hawaiian Babies Roll Their Eyes”, “Come on Papa”, “Daddy Long Legs” and “And He’d Say Oo-La-La Wee Wee.”

Ruby found his most sustained success as a composer after meeting the man who would become his longtime partner, lyricist Bert Kalmar. Kalmar and Ruby were a successful songwriting team for nearly three decades until Kalmar's death in 1947, a partnership portrayed in the 1950 MGM musical Three Little Words, starring Fred Astaire as Kalmar and Red Skelton as Ruby.

A good friend of Groucho Marx, Ruby appeared several times on his television program, You Bet Your Life. In his 1972 concert at Carnegie Hall, Marx gave the following introduction before performing a song of Ruby's: "I have a friend in Hollywood ... I think I do, I'm not so sure. [laughter] His name is Harry Ruby [applause] and he wrote a lot of songs that I've sung over the years ..."

 Today, Father, is Father's Day
 And we're giving you a tie
 It's not much we know
 It is just our way of showing you
 We think you're a regular guy
 You say that it was nice of us to bother
 But it really was a pleasure to fuss
 For according to our mother
 You're our father
 And that's good enough for us
 Yes, that's good enough for us

In The Dick Cavett Show, recorded June 13, 1969, Marx also sang a second stanza, and introduced it with, "Isn't that a beautiful melody? And a beautiful sentiment: ... Today, father, is father's day. ... 16 men in that orchestra: nine of them are illegitimate children [laughter]. Nine and a half including the director."

 The tie that you got
 Didn't cost such a lot
 And we'll give you the same tie next year.
 You tell us it was nice of us to bother
 But it really was a pleasure to fuss
 For they say, a child can only have one father
 And you are the one for us.
 And you are the one for us.

Selected film scores  
 Animal Crackers (1930)
 Horse Feathers (1932)
 Duck Soup (1933)
 Bright Lights (1935)
 Walking on Air (1936)
 Three Little Words (1950)

Selected screenplays 
 The Kid from Spain (1932)
 Horse Feathers (1932)
 Duck Soup (1933)
 Bright Lights (1935)
 Walking on Air (1936)
 The Life of the Party (1937)
 Lovely to Look At (1952)

Selected Broadway scores 
 Ziegfeld Follies of 1918 (1918) - revue - featured songwriter
 Helen of Troy, New York (1923) - musical - co-composer and co-lyricist
 No Other Girl (1924) - musical - co-composer and co-lyricist
 Holka Polka (1925) - musical - co-book-editor
 The Ramblers (1926) - musical - co-composer, co-lyricist and co-bookwriter
 Lucky (1927) - musical - co-bookwriter
 The Five O'Clock Girl (1927) - musical - composer
 She's My Baby (1928) - musical - co-bookwriter
 Good Boy (1928) - musical - co-composer and co-lyricist
 Animal Crackers (1928) - musical - co-composer and co-lyricist
 Top Speed (1929) - musical - co-producer and co-bookwriter
 High Kickers (1941) - musical - co-composer, co-lyricist and co-bookwriter
 Fosse (1998) - revue - featured songwriter for "Who's Sorry Now?" from All That Jazz 1979

Notable songs
"Rebecca Came Back From Mecca" (1921)
"The Sheik of Avenue B" (1922)
"Who's Sorry Now?" (1923), Kalmar and Ruby's first big hit
"I Wanna Be Loved by You" (1928), a hit for Helen Kane, known as the "Boop-boop-a-doop girl", and sung by Marilyn Monroe in the film Some Like It Hot
"Hooray for Captain Spaulding" from Animal Crackers (1928): became Groucho Marx's signature tune.
"I Love You So Much" (1928)
"Three Little Words" (1930), their biggest hit.
"Nevertheless" (1931), a hit for Jack Denny (vocal by Bob May) that year, later done by The Mills Brothers and Frank Sinatra
"I'm Against It", "I Always Get My Man" and "Everyone Says I Love You" from Horse Feathers (1932)
"Hail, Hail Freedonia" from Duck Soup (1933)
"What a Perfect Combination" (1932), lyrics by Kalmar and Irving Caesar, music by Ruby and Harry Akst, written for the Broadway show The Kid, starring Eddie Cantor
"A Kiss to Build a Dream On" (1935), their last hit
"The Real McCoys" (1957-1963), television theme

Selected bibliography
The Kalmar-Ruby Song Book Random House (1936) B009X7KK6K  Introduction by Ben Hecht with contributions by Groucho Marx, Robert Benchley, Moss Hart, Irving Berlin, Marc Connelly, James Kevin McGuinness, Franklin P. Adams and Nunnally Johnson.
Songs My Mother Never Sang Random House (1943) B002B9VFCA
The Four Marx Brothers in Monkey Business and Duck Soup Simon & Schuster (1973) 978-0671212735 S.J. Perelman; Will B. Johnstone; Bert Kalmar; and Harry Ruby

Death
Ruby died on February 23, 1974, in Woodland Hills, California, and was interred at the Chapel of the Pines in Los Angeles.

See also
:Category:Songs with music by Harry Ruby

References

External links

Photo of Harry Ruby
Harry Ruby at Allmusic
Harry Ruby at the Sheet Music Consortium
 Harry Ruby recordings at the Discography of American Historical Recordings.
Streaming audio
Harry Ruby on Victor Records
Harry Ruby on Edison Records
Harry Ruby at the Internet Archive
Video

1895 births
1974 deaths
Burials at Chapel of the Pines Crematory
Jewish American composers
Jewish American songwriters
Jewish American screenwriters
Vaudeville performers
20th-century American composers
20th-century American Jews